Kotick may mean:
Kotick, the name of a fur seal in Rudyard Kipling's story The White Seal
Teddy Kotick (June 4, 1928 – April 17, 1986), was a jazz bassist
Bobby Kotick (Robert A. Kotick, born 1963), an American businessman
Kotick Point (64°0′S 58°22′W), a place on the west coast of James Ross Island, Antarctica